Three Canadian naval units have carried the name HMCS Chignecto.

 (I) was a Second World War . Commissioned in October 1941, she was paid off in November 1945.
 (II) was a Bay-class minesweeper. Commissioned in December 1953, she was paid off in March 1954 and sold to France.
 (III), also a Bay-class minesweeper, was commissioned in August 1957.

Royal Canadian Navy ship names